The Frozard Plantation House, near Grand Coteau, Louisiana, was built around 1842 and was expanded in 1901.  It was listed on the National Register of Historic Places in 1982.

It has also been known as the Olivier Plantation.

References

Plantations in Louisiana
National Register of Historic Places in St. Landry Parish, Louisiana
Greek Revival architecture in Louisiana
Queen Anne architecture in Louisiana
Buildings and structures completed in 1842